Robert F. Sauvé (born June 17, 1955) is a Canadian former professional ice hockey goaltender, and currently a player agent.

Playing career
As a youth, Sauvé played in the 1967 Quebec International Pee-Wee Hockey Tournament with a minor ice hockey team from North Shore.

After a successful junior career with the Quebec Major Junior Hockey League's Laval National, Sauvé was drafted by the NHL's  Buffalo Sabres in the 1st round (17th overall) in 1975 NHL Entry Draft. The World Hockey Association's Cincinnati Stingers also selected Sauvé in round 2 (16th overall) in the 1975 WHA Amateur Draft, but his ambition was to play in the NHL. The Sabres selected three goaltenders in the 1975 draft, with Sauvé and Don Edwards being the most notable. Sauvé played four games for the Sabres during the 1976–77 season but spent the majority of the year with the AHL's Rhode Island Reds, while Edwards was initially the more successful of the two and was the first to stick with the big club in Buffalo. The next season saw Sauvé split time with the Hershey Bears and the Sabres as Edwards' backup.

As the 1978–79 season began, Sauvé entered training camp determined to make the NHL for good. Unfortunately, he suffered a broken finger and began the season in Hershey. After Edwards later suffered a sprained ankle, Sauvé was called up to Buffalo, this time to stay. The goaltending duo of Sauvé and Edwards had an immediate impact on the Sabres. Sauvé led the league in goals against average for the 1979–80 season and was co-recipient of the Vezina Trophy with Edwards in the same season.

Sauvé was traded to the Detroit Red Wings on December 2, 1981, but re-signed with the Sabres as a free agent on June 8, 1982, after Edwards was traded to the Calgary Flames. Sauvé was joined in net by a young phenom just out of high school named Tom Barrasso for the 1983–84 season, and the duo went on to share the William M. Jennings Trophy for fewest goals allowed in 1984–85. Barrasso was always quick to credit Sauvé for not only helping him but for challenging him with his own strong play. Sauvé was dealt by Buffalo to the Chicago Black Hawks in exchange for a 3rd round pick in the 1986 NHL Entry Draft. Sauvé spent two uneventful seasons in Chicago before signing with the New Jersey Devils as a free agent on July 10, 1987. After two seasons in New Jersey, Sauvé announced his retirement from the NHL in 1989 due to chronic back problems.

Other
Sauvé's younger brother, forward Jean-François Sauvé, also played in the NHL and was briefly a teammate of his older brother in Buffalo. His son Philippe Sauvé was a professional goaltender who played in the NHL and in Europe for the Hamburg Freezers. His nephew Maxime Sauvé was an NHL hockey forward.

Sauvé remained active in hockey after retirement, first as the president of the New Jersey Devils' alumni association, then as a goalie coach and later as a player agent. His list of clientele has included many of Quebec's biggest names including Patrick Roy, Vincent Lecavalier, Jocelyn Thibault, Pierre Turgeon, Vincent Damphousse and Simon Gagné.

Awards and achievements
 Selected to the QMJHL First All-Star Team in 1974.
 Vezina Trophy winner in 1980 (shared with Don Edwards).
 William M. Jennings Trophy winner in 1985 (shared with Tom Barasso).

Career statistics

References

External links
 

1955 births
Living people
Buffalo Sabres draft picks
Buffalo Sabres players
Canadian ice hockey goaltenders
Charlotte Checkers (SHL) players
Chicago Blackhawks players
Cincinnati Stingers draft picks
Detroit Red Wings players
Hershey Bears players
Ice hockey people from Montreal
Laval National players
National Hockey League first-round draft picks
New Jersey Devils players
People from L'Île-Bizard–Sainte-Geneviève
Providence Reds players
Rhode Island Reds players
Tucson Rustlers players
Verdun Maple Leafs (ice hockey) players
Vezina Trophy winners
William M. Jennings Trophy winners